Dario Purić (born 18 May 1986) is a Bosnian-Herzegovinian retired football midfielder who last played for Alfa Modriča.

Club career
Born in Slavonski Brod, SR Croatia, Purić started his career in FK Modriča, one of the most prosperous clubs in Bosnia at time, where he stayed until 2008 when the club won the Bosnian championship. In the summer of 2007 his spell with FK Modriča was interrupted when he joined Serbian Superliga club OFK Belgrade, where he stayed for a half season without making any appearances.

In the summer of 2008 he moved to NK Čelik Zenica and, in summer 2009, he was loaned to the usual Czech Republic European club competitions representing the Gambrinus liga club FC Slovan Liberec. In January 2010 he returned to NK Čelik Zenica and has been playing with the club until summer 2012.

In the summer of 2012 Purić moved to Serbia again, joining top league side FK Sloboda Užice.

International career
He has played regularly for the Bosnia and Herzegovina national under-21 football team, and is considered one of the most prospective Bosnian young footballers.

In December 2010, he made his debut and played his only game for the senior Bosnian national team, a friendly match against Poland.

Career statistics

Honours
Modriča
Bosnian-Herzegovinian Premier League: 2007–08
Republika Srpska Cup: 2007

FK Sarajevo
Bosnian-Herzegovinian Premier League:
Winners (1): 2014–15
Bosnian-Herzegovinian Cup:
Winners (1): 2013–14

References

External links
 

1986 births
Living people
Sportspeople from Slavonski Brod
Association football midfielders
Bosnia and Herzegovina footballers
Bosnia and Herzegovina under-21 international footballers
Bosnia and Herzegovina international footballers
FK Modriča players
OFK Beograd players
NK Čelik Zenica players
FC Slovan Liberec players
FK Sloboda Užice players
FK Sarajevo players
FK Slavija Sarajevo players
FK Tekstilac Derventa players
HNK Orašje players
NK Zvijezda Gradačac players
Premier League of Bosnia and Herzegovina players
Czech First League players
Serbian SuperLiga players
First League of the Republika Srpska players
First League of the Federation of Bosnia and Herzegovina players
Bosnia and Herzegovina expatriate footballers
Expatriate footballers in the Czech Republic
Bosnia and Herzegovina expatriate sportspeople in the Czech Republic
Expatriate footballers in Serbia
Bosnia and Herzegovina expatriate sportspeople in Serbia